Swifts Hill is a mountain in Barnstable County, Massachusetts. Riddle Hill is located south of Swifts Hill.

References

Mountains of Massachusetts
Mountains of Barnstable County, Massachusetts